Lyublino is a settlement under jurisdiction of the town of Svetly in Kaliningrad Oblast, Russia.

History
The settlement was founded in 1400. In 1454, the region was incorporated by King Casimir IV Jagiellon to the Kingdom of Poland upon the request of the anti-Teutonic Prussian Confederation. After the subsequent Thirteen Years' War, since 1466, it formed part of Poland as a fief held by the Teutonic Order, and from 1525 held by Ducal Prussia. From the 18th century it was part of the Kingdom of Prussia, and from 1871 to 1945 it was also part of Germany, within which it was administratively located in the Kreis Fischhausen (district) in the province of East Prussia. It was known for being the site of an airship base, and then a Luftwaffe airbase. During World War II, from September 1944 to January 1945, the airbase was the location of a subcamp of the Stutthof concentration camp, in which Nazi Germans imprisoned around 1,100 Jewish women and 100 Jewish men as forced labour. Following the war, the settlement passed to the Soviet Union.

See also
List of inhabited localities in Kaliningrad Oblast

References

Rural localities in Kaliningrad Oblast
Holocaust locations in Russia